Algitalea is a Gram-negative, strictly aerobic, rod-shaped, non-spore-forming genus of bacteria from the family of Flavobacteriaceae with one known species (Algitalea ulvae). Algitalea ulvae has been isolated from the alga Ulva pertusa.

References

Flavobacteria
Bacteria genera
Monotypic bacteria genera
Taxa described in 2015